Ayrton Cicilia is a footballer who currently plays for Real Rincon. Born in Curaçao, he represents the Bonaire national football team.

Club career
Cicilia has played for Real Rincon of the Bonaire League since at least 2015. In 2016 Cicilia was named Bonaire's male football MVP because of his performances in the Bonaire League and the ABC Inter-insular tournament. With Real Rincon, Cicilia was the joint top scorer of the 2017/18 Bonaire League along with Rai-Cesar Cicilia with 14 goals.

Cicilia was selected as one of Bonaire's top twelve footballers and given the opportunity to compete in a tournament in Germany in May 2018. 

Real Rincon qualified for the 2018 CONCACAF Caribbean Club Shield by winning the 2017–18 Bonaire League. In the tournament, Real became the first club from Bonaire to advance to the semi-finals of a CONCACAF tournament. Real Rincon went on to win bronze in the tournament with Cicilia scoring a brace in the 3rd place match against SV Deportivo Nacional of Aruba. 

In August 2018, Cicilia went on a 2-day trial with Almere City FC of the Dutch Eerste Divisie.

Cicilia competed with Real Rincon in the 2018 Kopa ABC. The new tournament pitted the league champions and runners-up of Aruba, Bonaire, and Curaçao against each other. Cicilia was good for two assist in the first game against SV Deportivo Nacional Cicilia has scored in the second game of the tournament against S.V. Vesta and he scored a brace in the tournament final victory over CRKSV Jong Holland to win the title.

From January to March 2019, Cicilia went on a trial with Sparta Rotterdam of the Dutch Eredivisie. Cicilia went one more time on 2-day trial with Sparta Rotterdam, one in December and the other one in January.

International career
Cicilia was named to Bonaire's squad for 2019–20 CONCACAF Nations League qualifying. He made his senior international debut on 9 September 2018 in the team's opening match against the Dominican Republic. He was named a starter and played the full match in the eventual 0–5 defeat.

In the 2022–23 CONCACAF Nations League, Bonaire played in League C. Cicilia was again called up for the June match window. Cicilia scored in 3 out of Bonaire's 4 matches, including a hat trick in a 4-1 victory over British Virgin Islands. He was also instrumental in two 2-0 victories against U.S. Virgin Islands, scoring the opening goal in both games. With 5 goals, Cicilia led the entire Nations League in scoring halfway through the competition.

International goals
Last updated 14 June 2022.

International career statistics

References

External links
National Football Teams profile
WDB Sport profile

Living people
Association football midfielders
Bonaire international footballers
2001 births
Bonaire footballers